Mohamed Mohsen (born 10 May 1989) is the chairman and managing director of Exclusive Movies and an Egyptian producer.
He had graduated from The Higher Institute of Cinema in 2002, and chosen to work in documentary films since his graduation as a producer, and he also worked in Directing Commercials, and directed film, and the first movie he directed was "The Party". , He began his directing career primarily with short movies and commercials, after which he shifted to full-length movies.
He is the Executive Manager and Chairman of Exclusive Movies Company.

His Life 
Graduated from Higher Institute of Cinema , and worked as an executive producer in a number of television productions and theatrical performances. His debut as a director was in the twenty-first century, and he directed the movie “The Party”, which was shown in 2013 and starring Ahmed Ezz, then his work in cinema and television continued, and he presented in his series “Wish Thani”, which was shown in 2015, then he turned to film production, and in 2020 he founded the “Exclusive Movies” company, which It produced a number of successful films such as “Under the threat of the weapon” and “Toxic”, and the first film produced by the company was the movie “They went out and did not return», whose story was written by Wael youssef and starring Hosny Sheta , Wezo and was shown in 2022.

Film career 
Mohamed Mohsen released his first feature movie, Keep Meet Me , in 2009. The Series was enthusiastically received among critics, and was the movie for which Mohamed Mohsen was awarded the title of "Best New Director in 2009."

Filmography

Films

References

External links 
 
 

Egyptian film directors
Living people
1989 births